Andrei Iurievich Stoliarov (born 9 January 1977) is a Russian professional tennis player and a former member of the Russia Davis Cup team.

Stoliarov gained entry to the 2002 French Open as a lucky loser, where he won his first round match against Jonas Björkman. In the second round, Stoliarov led world number 1 Lleyton Hewitt 6–4, 5–0, before Hewitt fought back to win 4–6, 7–6(5), 6–0, 7–5.

Career finals

Singles (1 loss)

Team titles 
2002 - Davis Cup winner with Russia

References

External links
 
 
 

1977 births
Living people
Sportspeople from Sochi
Russian male tennis players
Universiade medalists in tennis
Universiade bronze medalists for Russia
Medalists at the 1995 Summer Universiade